Boarhunt is a village and civil parish in the City of Winchester district of Hampshire, England, about  north-east of Fareham. The name of the village is a corruption of burh funta, the funta, (stream) by the fort (burh).

History

The settlement is mentioned in the Domesday survey of 1086, when there were 27 households.

Church
The village church is dedicated to St Nicholas; it is almost completely Saxon in its structure with its font probably dating to the same period. The building has been dated as having been constructed in 1064. Further work appears to have taken place in the 13th century. In 1577 a monument to Ralph Henslowe was added to the interior. A general restoration was carried out in 1853 at which point a bell-turret was added and the current furnishings were fitted.

References

External links
- Boarhunt Parish Council website

City of Winchester
Villages in Hampshire